Dragons Forever is a 1988 Hong Kong martial arts action-comedy film directed by Sammo Hung, who also starred in the film and co-directed by Corey Yuen. The film co-stars Jackie Chan, Yuen Biao, Deannie Yip, Pauline Yeung, and Crystal Kwok. It is the last film in which Hung, Chan and Biao all appeared in together, as later Chan subsequently focused on his solo film career.

Plot
A fishery is seeking court action against a local chemical factory for polluting the water. The mysterious chemical company hires lawyer Jackie Lung to find information that will discredit the fishery. He employs his arms dealer friend, Wong to woo the fishery owner, Miss Yip, to try to convince her to settle out of court.

Lung also brings in goofy inventor and professional criminal, Tung, to bug her apartment. Unfortunately, Wong and Tung are unaware of each other's roles and soon come into confrontation, while Lung tries to maintain the peace.

Wong falls for Miss Yip, whilst Lung woos her cousin, Miss Wen, an environmental scientist who is going to testify on Miss Yip's behalf. The three men inadvertently discover that the chemical company is just a facade for a narcotics empire, ran by Hua Hsien-Wu (Yuen Wah). They soon come up against Hua's thugs, and ultimately infiltrate the factory for a showdown with Hua himself and his henchman - martial arts master.

Versions
There are three distinct versions of the film: the Hong Kong theatrical release (94 minutes), the international theatrical release (94 minutes), and the Japanese theatrical release (98 minutes). Two scenes with Timothy Tung Te-Biao (Yuen Biao) visiting a psychiatrist (played by Lucky Stars veteran Stanley Fung) were cut from the domestic Hong Kong print of the film, but remain intact in the international version and the Japanese version. These scenes, titled "Couch Potato" and "Mr Kinetic", appeared as extras on the Hong Kong Legends DVD of the film. In the latter, the psychiatrist was in the process of being robbed. So that Tung would not realise a robbery was taking place, one of the robbers, posing as the psychiatrist, gave him advice over the intercom - to "kill the witnesses", which explains why Tung attacks Jackie Lung (Chan) and Nancy Lee (Pauline Yeung) in a later scene, wearing a mask and armed with a knife.

Several scenes were slightly trimmed for the international version. The only scene completely omitted shows how Tung Te-Biao leads Jackie and Nancy into the chemical factory, having informed them about the danger Wong Fei-Hung (Sammo Hung) was in. They locate a hidden door, leading to where Wong is held captive and the drugs are refined. Ling distracts the guard, allowing Jackie the opportunity to attack. This scene is intact in the Hong Kong and Japanese versions. The Japanese version is the only one that contains all scenes in their complete form, except that it replaces the original end credits crawl of the police arrival at the factory with a different end credits crawl featuring outtakes from the film.

In 2020 a limited edition Blu-ray containing fully restored transfers of all three versions was released by 88 Films.

Cast

Reception
On the Hong Kong Legends DVD release of Dragons Forever, Hong Kong cinema expert Bey Logan offers his opinion on why the film underperformed both in the domestic and Japanese markets. The primary reason cited is that the actors played roles against type. Jackie Chan plays a slick lawyer who chases women, in contrast to the happy-go-lucky everyman characters he usually plays. Similarly, Yuen Biao plays an eccentric and possibly mentally disturbed character, rather than the underdog character fans were used to. For Sammo Hung, rather than the timid character that has been described in earlier films, he instead plays like a rascal. Logan explains that in general, the cinema going public in Hong Kong are not as open to such departures of role as, perhaps, Western audiences would be.

Additional reasons cited include the occasional use of coarse language in the film, and the scenes of narcotics production, particularly Hung's character being injected with drugs against his will. The fact that Chan's character has a relationship with a woman may also have had an effect, particularly in the Japanese market, as many female viewers could not accept that their idol was not single. On learning that Chan was in a relationship in real life, one Japanese fan had committed suicide, and another poisoned herself in the offices of Golden Harvest.

Box office
In Hong Kong, Dragons Forever grossed HK$33,578,920 during its theatrical run. In Taiwan, it was the eight highest-grossing film of 1988, earning  (US$441,861). In Japan, where it was released as Cyclone Z, the film earned  at the box office. This adds up to  grossed in Hong Kong, Taiwan and Japan.

In South Korea, the film sold 179,985 tickets in the capital city of Seoul.

Awards
 1989 Hong Kong Film Awards
 Nomination: Best Action Choreography

See also
 
 
 
 List of Hong Kong films
 Jackie Chan filmography

References

External links
 
 

1988 films
1980s action comedy films
1980s martial arts comedy films
1980s Cantonese-language films
Films directed by Corey Yuen
Films directed by Sammo Hung
Films set in Hong Kong
Golden Harvest films
Hong Kong action comedy films
Hong Kong martial arts comedy films
Triad films
1980s Hong Kong films